The Ta-Ching Government Bank, known as the Ta-Ching Bank of the Ministry of Revenue (大清戶部銀行) from 1905 to 1908, was the name of the Bank of China as a government agency of the Qing dynasty until the empire's dissolution in 1912. It was originally created to serve as the central bank of China in 1905, originally as a division of the Ministry of Revenue, and would serve as the country's de facto central bank until the establishment of the Central Bank of China in 1924.

The Ta-Ching Government Bank was the first national bank in the history of China and served as both the country's central bank as well as a commercial bank to finance projects. It issued banknotes that were intended to unify the Qing dynasty's currency system.

The Ta-Ching Government Bank evolved into the Bank of China in mainland China and the Mega International Commercial Bank in Taiwan.

History  
 

During the later part of the Qing dynasty era there was a discussion on whether or not the imperial Chinese government would have to establish a national bank which it finally did in 1905. Peng Shu (彭述) stated before the introduction of new banknotes that the national bank would have to keep sufficient reserves in "touchable" money (現金) at all times. The large number of private notes that were being produced all over the empire was to be restricted by introducing a stamp duty (印花稅). The reformer Liang Qichao campaigned for the government of the Qing dynasty to emulate the Western world and Japan by embracing the gold standard, unify refractory the currencies of China, and issue government-backed banknotes with a ⅓ metallic reserve. In 1904 the Ministry of Revenue had officially authorised the creation of a central bank. At the time of its establishment, China was still on the silver standard. The Ta-Ching Government Bank was primarily created to help finance government deficits by issuing paper money.

At the end of 1905 the Ta-Ching Bank of the Ministry of Revenue (大清戶部銀行) was founded, and the production of the banknotes was entrusted to the prints of the Beiyang Newspaper (北洋報局) in Northern China. The Ta-Ching Government Bank was the earliest officially opened national bank in China, and it opened its first office in the capital city of Beijing on September 27, 1905 (Guangxu 31). The newly established national bank had a dual nature of being both a central bank and a commercial bank.

In 1906 the government of the Qing dynasty sent students to Japan to be educated about modern printing techniques, with the aim to have the Shanghai Commercial Press print the cheques of the Ministry's Bank. The Shanghai branch of the Ta-Ching Government Bank was located at 3–5, Hankou Road. In 1907 it opened its Jinan branch.

In 1912 the Ta-Ching Government bank was renamed to the Bank of China by government charter of the new Republican government. After the Chinese Civil War ended in 1949, the Bank of China effectively split into two operations. Part of the bank relocated to Taiwan with the Kuomintang (KMT) government, and was privatised in 1971 to become the International Commercial Bank of China. In 2002, it merged with Chiao Tung Bank to become the Mega International Commercial Bank. The Mainland operation is the current entity known as the Bank of China.

Banknotes  
 
 

The Ta-Ching Bank of the Ministry of Revenue were still issuing two different types of banknotes, one series was denominated in "tael" (兩), these were known as the Yinliang Piao (銀兩票)  and had the denominations of 1 tael, 5 taels, 10 taels, 50 taels, and 100 taels. The other series was denominated in "yuan" and were known as Yinyuan Piao (銀元票) and were issued in the denominations of 1 yuan, 5 yuan, 10 yuan, 50 yuan, and 100 yuan. In the year 1907 the Ta-Ching Bank of the Ministry of Revenue was renamed to the "Ta-Ching Government Bank" (大清銀行), accordingly the inscription on all banknotes had to be changed to reflect this. Because there is no advanced engraving technology for banknotes in China at the time and the banknotes that were printed by the Beiyang Newspaper's commercial press were both expensive to make and easy to imitate, the government of the Qing dynasty had later commissioned the American Bank Note Company to print new banknotes for the Ta-Ching Government Bank.

Following the Chinese tradition of issuing new money in a new reign, the Xuantong administration had the design of the official Ta-Ching Government Bank paper notes somewhat changed to herald in the new emperor. The new design was inspired by the designs of the banknotes of the United States dollar of this era; some banknotes showed the portrait of Li Hongzhang, and others depicted that of Zaifeng, Prince Chun who at the time was the current Chinese Minister of Finance. At the eve of the Xinhai Revolution in 1911, there were 5,400,000 tael worth of Yinliang banknotes circulating in China, and 12,400,000 yuan in Yinyuan banknotes.

References  

 
 

Economy of the Qing dynasty
Banks established in 1905
Economic history of China
Banking in China
Bank of China
Chinese companies established in 1905
Former central banks